The A-series trains are a class of electric multiple unit built by Walkers Limited in Maryborough, Queensland for Transperth between 1991 and 1999. When introduced in 1991, the A-series trains became the first electric passenger trains to operate in Western Australia and until 2004, were the only type of train in use on the Perth suburban rail network.

History 
Studies for the electrification of Perth's suburban rail network began in 1984 and in 1988 43 two-car electric railcars were ordered from Walkers Limited, Maryborough. Prior to this, Perth's rail transport network consisted of three railway lines radiating from Perth and operated by a mixture of diesel railcars and diesel locomotive hauled trains. In 1979, one of these lines, the Fremantle line, was closed but reopened in 1983 following a change in State Government.

The trains were transported across the continent on standard gauge bogies and converted to Western Australia's  gauge standard locally. The first set, set 01, arrived in September 1990 and immediately became the subject of industrial action at Westrail's Midland Railway Workshops over a pay dispute and the impending one-man train operation which the new trains would ensure.

Testing of the new trains began soon afterwards and mostly on the Armadale line while the electrification process continued. While the trials were largely successful a number of negative points were noted, not the least of which were braking issues and the creation of a harmonic vibration from the train's bogies which caused nausea in otherwise healthy passengers.

The trains entered revenue service on the 28 September 1991, running Perth Royal Show specials and by April 1992 had virtually taken over the suburban network timetables, with only a very limited number of services still operated by the older diesel trains. The last entered service on 30 October 1992.

Some sets have been named:
 01 City of Perth named 11 April 1992
 02 City of Armadale named 11 April 1992
 03 Shire of Swan named 11 April 1992
 04 City of Fremantle named 11 April 1992
 05 City of Wanneroo named 21 March 1993
 43 City of Maryborough named 30 October 1993

The new trains revolutionised the commuter services on the Perth network, but their success was marred by project delays and a number of early accidents. Some of those accidents involved collisions with motor vehicles at unprotected level crossings, the increased speed and quieter operation as opposed to the older, slower and louder, diesel trains being considered as a contributing factor. In three accidents within the first twelve months of operations three fatalities - all in motor vehicles - were suffered.

Other accidents did not involve loss of life and some, such as a collision between sets while shunting at the train depot at Claisebrook, meant that some sets were mixed while their other half underwent repairs. Several months in 1993, for instance, saw the pairings of AEA226 and AEB339, and AEA217 and AEB326. When repairs were completed the original set combinations were restored.

Additionally, a number of teething troubles soon presented themselves, such as braking problems which meant that trains would sometimes fail to stop in the space required and thus not be correctly positioned at the station platforms. These problems were eventually overcome and the type has provided stable service ever since.

In April 1997, a further five were ordered, entering service in 1998/99. These sets introduced longitudinal seating and the current green Transperth livery to the fleet, and with detail improvements including internal information panels, extra security cameras and quieter wheel motors, were subsequently dubbed 'second generation' sets. They are externally identical. Some of the first generation trains were then progressively updated to bring them inline with the more recent units.

All are scheduled to be replaced by C-series from 2023.

Configuration 
Each set consists of two semi-permanently coupled cars, designated AEA and AEB, both of which have a driver’s cab and powered bogies. Up to three sets may be coupled together to make a six-car train, although common practice is to operate them only as either two- or four-car set consists. There are currently 48 two-car A-series trains in operation.

Originally, the majority of A-series trains featured two inward-facing rows of bench seats either side of the car forward of the front set of doors and to the back of the rear set of doors, with two-seat rows running down each side of the car in between the doors. In this configuration each car has the capacity to carry 72 seated and 82 standing passengers, giving unmodified the A-series trains a total capacity of 308.

However, since 2010, all sets have been reconfigured with two inward-facing bench rows running the entire length of the car. This reduces the number of seats available but increases standing room capacity. Each car has 1-2 wheelchair spaces available.

Upgrades 
Over time the A Series has had many upgrades, Those include new External Destination Indicators (EDI) and Internal Passenger Information Displays (PID), Passenger Emergency Intercom (PEI), USB Charging and Onboard Public Address System for controlling Announcements which were designed and supplied by COMRAIL. Upgrades to the traction/brake traction controllers were made by retrofitting the fleet with a controller similar to those found in the B Series. The controllers improved operation comfort and control reliability, As the older controller design caused discomfort to the driver if used for long periods of time and suffered from a very "Notchy and inconsistent" feel when changing between traction and brake levels.

In service 
The A-series trains mainly runs on the Fremantle, Midland, and Armadale/Thornlie lines. Until late-2016, the Joondalup and Mandurah lines were also serviced by 12 two-car A-series trains at high-demand periods. They are now exclusively serviced by newer B-Series trains. C-Series trains are also planned to be built from 2022 to accommodate rail network expansion under the Metronet program.

USB charging ports 

In early-2016, A-Series Sets 43 and 44 were fitted by COMRAIL with USB charging ports as part of a 6-month trial which was deemed successful. The USB port were designed and built by COMRAIL for the PTA to handle the harsh conditions and were tested to rail specifications. They are located at the wheelchair bays, on the exterior of the door housing alongside the priority seats and beside the inter-carriage gangway door.

See also 
 Transperth B-series train
 Queensland Rail Suburban multiple unit
 Queensland Rail Interurban multiple unit

References

Bibliography

External links 

Electric multiple units of Western Australia
Public transport in Perth, Western Australia
Train-related introductions in 1991
25 kV AC multiple units
Adtranz multiple units
Walkers Limited multiple units
ABB multiple units